Ruth Hassell-Thompson (
Hassell; born November 6, 1942) of Mount Vernon, New York, is a former State Senator who represented the 36th district of New York, which includes the Bronx neighborhoods of Norwood, Bedford Park, Williamsbridge, Co-op City, Wakefield and Baychester and City of Mount Vernon.

Political career and background

Born November 6, 1942 in New York City to Branon Hassell and Thelma Crump Hassell, Hassell-Thompson worked as a pediatric nurse and substance abuse counselor for Mount Vernon Hospital from 1963 to 1998. From January 1980 to June 1987, she was executive director of the Westchester Minority Contractor's Association (WMCA). Prior to leading the WMCA, she worked for the Westchester Community Opportunity Program for 10 years in a number of management positions.

She served as president/CEO of Whart Development Company Inc., a real estate development company and a consultant to small and developing businesses before being elected to Mount Vernon City Council in 1993. She would later serve as council president and acting mayor.

In 2000, she was elected to the State Senate. She is the chairwoman of the Crime Victims, Crime and Corrections Committee and is a former ranking minority member on the Consumer Protection and Judiciary committees.

Hassell-Thompson announced on April 22, 2016, that she would be leaving the Senate to work for Governor Andrew Cuomo. She worked as special adviser for policy and community affairs of New York State Homes and Community Renewal.

See also
New York State Senate
 2009 New York State Senate leadership crisis

Notes

Further reading
Paterson, David "Black, Blind, & In Charge: A Story of Visionary Leadership and Overcoming Adversity." Skyhorse Publishing. New York, New York, 2020

External links
New York State Senate: Ruth Hassell-Thompson

Living people
Politicians from Westchester County, New York
African-American state legislators in New York (state)
African-American women in politics
Democratic Party New York (state) state senators
Women state legislators in New York (state)
American substance abuse counselors
African-American nurses
American nurses
American women nurses
21st-century American politicians
1942 births
21st-century American women politicians
Politicians from Mount Vernon, New York
African-American city council members in New York (state)
Women city councillors in New York (state)
21st-century African-American women
21st-century African-American politicians
20th-century African-American people
20th-century African-American women